Events from the year 1924 in Canada.

Incumbents

Crown 
 Monarch – George V

Federal government 
 Governor General – Julian Byng 
 Prime Minister – William Lyon Mackenzie King
 Chief Justice – Louis Henry Davies (Prince Edward Island) (until 1 May) then Francis Alexander Anglin (Ontario)
 Parliament – 14th

Provincial governments

Lieutenant governors 
Lieutenant Governor of Alberta – Robert Brett 
Lieutenant Governor of British Columbia – Walter Cameron Nichol  
Lieutenant Governor of Manitoba – James Albert Manning Aikins    
Lieutenant Governor of New Brunswick – William Frederick Todd 
Lieutenant Governor of Nova Scotia – MacCallum Grant   
Lieutenant Governor of Ontario – Henry Cockshutt
Lieutenant Governor of Prince Edward Island – Murdock MacKinnon (until September 8) then Frank Richard Heartz 
Lieutenant Governor of Quebec – Louis-Philippe Brodeur (until January 1) then Narcisse Pérodeau (from January 8)
Lieutenant Governor of Saskatchewan – Henry William Newlands

Premiers 
Premier of Alberta – Herbert Greenfield  
Premier of British Columbia – John Oliver  
Premier of Manitoba – John Bracken 
Premier of New Brunswick – Peter Veniot 
Premier of Nova Scotia – Ernest Howard Armstrong 
Premier of Ontario – George Howard Ferguson  
Premier of Prince Edward Island – James D. Stewart
Premier of Quebec – Louis-Alexandre Taschereau 
Premier of Saskatchewan – Charles Avery Dunning

Territorial governments

Commissioners 
 Gold Commissioner of Yukon – George P. MacKenzie 
 Commissioner of Northwest Territories – William Wallace Cory

Events

January 3 – First session of the British Columbia Older Boys' Parliament (now the British Columbia Youth Parliament) held in Victoria, British Columbia.
January 10 – Narcisse Pérodeau becomes Quebec's 14th Lieutenant Governor.
January 26 – An Order in Council mandates the use of the Canadian Red Ensign on Canadian government buildings outside Canada. It the first officially allowed use of the flag on land, although it has been used unofficially for many years.
April 1 – The Royal Canadian Air Force is formed.
May 1 – Prince Edward Island changes from driving on the left to the right.
May 24 – Prohibition ends in Alberta.
June – Rodeo's first one-hand bareback rigging is designed and made by rodeo cowboy and saddle maker Earl Bascom at the Bascom Ranch in Stirling, Alberta
July 3 – The Chateau Lake Louise burns down
October 24 – Former provincial treasurer Peter Smith and financier Aemilius Jarvis are found guilty in connection with the Ontario Bond Scandal.
October 29 – An explosion kills Doukhobor leader Peter Verigin and eight other passengers on a CPR train from Brilliant to Grand Forks, British Columbia.  Ten others are injured. Although never proven, it is alleged that Verigin was assassinated using a time bomb.

Arts and literature

Science and technology
August – Mars is closer to Earth than it has been for many years and mysterious wireless signals are picked up at a Vancouver wireless station. It is thought by some to be evidence of martian contact.
October 21 – CFYC carried a speech made by Prime Minister Mackenzie King from the Denman Arena, considered to be Canada's first federal political broadcast.

Sports

Basketball
The Edmonton Grads win their first international basketball tournament held as part of the 1924 Summer Olympics in Paris. As it was only a demonstration sport, no medals were awarded. The Grads would dominate women's basketball tournaments from 1924 to 1936.

Hockey
The Toronto Granite Club win the gold medal at the first Winter Olympics in Chamonix. The Canadian team beat the American team 6–1 after a ferocious, injury-filled game.
March 25 – the National Hockey League's Montreal Canadiens win their second Stanley Cup by defeating the Western Canada Hockey League's Calgary Tigers 2 games to 0. The deciding game was played in Ottawa's Ottawa Auditorium.
March 26 and 28 – Ontario Hockey Association's  Owen Sound Greys won their first Memorial Cup by defeating Calgary City Junior Hockey League's Calgary Canadians 7 to 5 in 2 game aggregate played at Shea's Amphitheatre in Winnipeg 
November 29 – The Montreal Forum opens

Football
 November 29 – Queen's University wins their third and final Grey Cup by defeating the Toronto Balmy Beach Beachers 11–3 in the 12th Grey Cup played at Toronto's Varsity Stadium

Births

January to March
January 5 – Gerry Plamondon, ice hockey player (d. 2019)
January 10 – Ludmilla Chiriaeff, ballet dancer, choreographer and director (d. 1996)
January 29 – Marcelle Ferron, painter and stained glass artist (d. 2001)
January 29 – Lois Marshall, soprano (d. 1997)
February 3 – Martial Asselin, politician and Lieutenant Governor of Quebec (d. 2013)
February 7 – Ivor Dent, politician and mayor of Edmonton (d. 2009)
February 18 – Nicolo Rizzuto, Italian-Canadian mobster (d. 2010)
February 24 
 Remi De Roo, Roman Catholic bishop (d. 2022)
 Douglas Jung, politician and first Chinese Canadian MP in the House of Commons of Canada (d. 2002)
 Erik Nielsen, politician (d. 2008)
March 11 – Eva Von Gencsy, dancer (d. 2013)
March 18 – Johnny Papalia, mobster (d. 1997)

April to June
April 5 – Orville Howard Phillips, politician and Senator (d. 2009)
April 20 – Guy Rocher, sociologist and academic 
April 29 – Al Balding, golfer (d. 2006)
May 26 – Nancy Bell, senator (d. 1989)
May 28 – Paul Hébert, actor (d. 2017)
June 2 – June Callwood, journalist, author and social activist (d. 2007)
June 3 – Colleen Dewhurst, actress (d. 1991)
June 22 – Larkin Kerwin, physicist, President of the Canadian Space Agency (d. 2004)
June 14 – Arthur Erickson, architect and urban planner (d. 2009)
June 21 – Wally Fawkes, Canadian-born jazz clarinettist and cartoonist (d. 2023 in the United Kingdom)

July to September
July 11 – Eugene Whelan, politician and Minister (d. 2013)
July 20 – Mort Garson, electronic musician (d. 2008)
July 21 – Lynn R. Williams, labour leader (d. 2014)
July 29 – Lloyd Bochner, actor (d. 2005)
July 30 – Roland Penner, politician (d. 2018)
September 13 – Léonel Beaudoin, politician (d. 2021)
September 19 – Don Harron, comedian, actor, director, journalist, author and composer (d. 2015)

October to December
October 18 – Buddy MacMaster, fiddle player (d. 2014)
November 1 – Jean-Luc Pépin, academic, politician and Minister (d. 1995)
November 10 – Danny Cameron, politician (d. c2009)
November 11 – Evelyn Wawryshyn, baseball player
November 24 – Lorne Munroe, Canadian-American cellist and educator (d. 2020)
December 6 – Donald Jack, novelist and playwright (d. 2003)
December 15 – Robert B. Salter, surgeon (d. 2010)
December 19 – Doug Harvey, ice hockey player (d. 1989)
December 20 – Judy LaMarsh, politician and Minister, lawyer, author and broadcaster (d. 1980)
December 22 – A. Edison Stairs, businessman and politician, New Brunswick MLA (1960–1978) and Minister of Finance (1974–1976), natural causes (d. 2010)

Deaths
January 23 – James Wilson Morrice, painter (b.1865)
May 1 – Louis Henry Davies, lawyer, businessman, politician and 3rd Premier of Prince Edward Island (b.1845)
June 6 – Laure Conan, novelist (b.1845)
August 13 – Joseph Bolduc, politician, Speaker of the Senate (b. 1847)
September 21 – Edouard Deville, cartographer and Surveyor General of Canada (b.1850)
October 29 – Peter Verigin, philosopher, activist and leader and preacher of the Doukhobors (b.1859)
December 9 – Judson Burpee Black, physician and politician (b.1842)

See also
 List of Canadian films

Historical documents
House banking committee decides government should have audited Home Bank before it failed, and clients have moral claim for redress

Immigration pamphlet calls Canadian climate "particularly suited to the white race" in "a British country, with British customs and ideals"

Kiuga hereditary chief describes inequalities since 1924 imposition of elective council system on First Nations

Metis man's memories of buffalo hunts and 1885 resistance

Alberta Presbyterians object to undemocratic process for union with Methodist and Congregational churches

Lethal smallpox epidemic in Windsor, Ont. stopped by vaccination

"Swoile" (seal), "insides" (underwear), "tizzie" (dry cough), "skipper" (youngest son), "wellaway" (rich) and other Labrador lingo

Professor of English speaks on feeling sorry for ourselves

Photo: Arctic traveller's snapshot of Inuit dancing in "Victoria Land" (Victoria Island), Northwest Territories

Film: sailing and baseball - on ice

References

 
Years of the 20th century in Canada
Canada
1924 in North America
1920s in Canada